Mengeš is a settlement in the Upper Carniola region of Slovenia. It is the seat of the Municipality of Mengeš. It is located approximately fifteen kilometers from the Slovenian capital of Ljubljana. It includes the hamlets of Zavrti, Veliki Mengeš, Mali Mengeš, and Pristava.

Name
Mengeš was first attested in written sources in 1154–56 as Meingosburg (and as Mengospurch in 1214–20, Mengozesburc in 1226, and Meingospurch in 1243). The Slovene name is a clipped form of Middle High German Meingos(purch), which is a compound of Meingoz (a personal name) + purch 'castle', thus meaning 'castle belonging to Meingoz'. In the past the German name was Mannsburg.

Church

The parish church in the settlement is dedicated to Archangel Michael.

Notable people
Notable people that were born or lived in Mengeš include:
Ferdinand Augustin Hallerstein (1703–1774), astronomer, mathematician
Janez Trdina (1830–1905) writer, historian
Jurij Andrej Gallenfels (1651–1699), Renaissance humanist
Ignac Holzapfel (1799–1868), poet
Anton Koblar (1854–1928), historian
Franc Lah (1816–1890), sculptor
Lovro Letnar (1855–1913), schoolmaster
Anton Mrkun (1876–1961), priest and historian
Franc Ropret (1878–1952), sculptor
Miha Stare (1790–1872), businessman

Gallery

References

External links

Mengeš on Geopedia

Populated places in the Municipality of Mengeš
Cities and towns in Upper Carniola